The Stockberg is a mountain of the Appenzell Alps, overlooking Nesslau in the canton of St. Gallen. It lies on the range west of the Säntis.

References

External links
Stockberg on Hikr

Mountains of the Alps
Mountains of the canton of St. Gallen
Appenzell Alps
One-thousanders of Switzerland
Mountains of Switzerland